Ekaterina Alexandrovna Voronina (born 16 February 1992 in Tashkent) is an Uzbekistani track and field athlete who competes in the heptathlon. Her personal best for the event is 5912 points. She was the gold medallist in the event at the 2014 Asian Games. She is part of the Central Army Sports Club and is coached by Pavel Andreev, a compatriot and fellow multi-eventer.

As a teenager, Voronina specialised in the javelin throw and was runner-up at the national championships at the age of fifteen. She represented her country in that event at the 2009 World Youth Championships in Athletics, competing in the qualifying round only. She took up the heptathlon event in 2011 and soon afterwards won the Uzbekistan national title with a personal best of 5287 points. After an absence in the 2012 season she returned to make her senior international debut at the 2013 Asian Athletics Championships. Five personal bests saw her accumulate 5599 points and take the silver medal behind the defending champion, Wassana Winatho of Thailand. Voronina won her second national title in September that year.

At the start of the following season, she entered her first major women's pentathlon competition at the 2014 Asian Indoor Athletics Championships. She had a three-way tie on 3951 points with Irina Karpova and Sepideh Tavakoli and was placed fourth on head-to-head results. Yuliya Tarasova, another Uzbekistani athlete, was the silver medallist at the competition. Moving into the outdoor season she set a personal best of 5890 points in Asikkala in August. She was chosen to compete at the 2014 Asian Games and established herself among the region's best athletes by taking the gold medal in a score of 5912 points. Setting bests in the 100 metres hurdles, high jump, 200 metres, and the 800 metres final, she beat both defending champion Tarasova and the Asian indoor champion Wang Qingling of China.

International competitions

Personal bests

Heptathlon – 6346 points (2021)
100 metres hurdles – 14.19 sec (2021)
High jump – 1.85 m (2021)
Shot put – 14.05 m (2019)
200 metres – 24.67 sec (2021)
Long jump – 6.27 m (2021)
Javelin throw – 53.53 m (2019)
800 metres – 2:14.81 min (2018)

Women's pentathlon – 4386 points (2023)
60 metres hurdles – 8.76 sec (2023)
High jump – 1.81 m (2016)
Shot put – 13.66 m (2015)
Long jump – 6.00 m (2015)
800 metres – 2:17.22 min (2023)

References

1992 births
Living people
Sportspeople from Tashkent
Uzbekistani heptathletes
Uzbekistani female athletes
Asian Games gold medalists for Uzbekistan
Asian Games medalists in athletics (track and field)
Athletes (track and field) at the 2014 Asian Games
Athletes (track and field) at the 2018 Asian Games
World Athletics Championships athletes for Uzbekistan
Athletes (track and field) at the 2016 Summer Olympics
Olympic athletes of Uzbekistan
Medalists at the 2014 Asian Games
Asian Athletics Championships winners
Athletes (track and field) at the 2020 Summer Olympics
21st-century Uzbekistani women